Salt Rain is a 2004 novel by Australian novelist Sarah Armstrong.

Plot summary

After the disappearance of her mother Mae, fourteen-year-old Allie Curran goes to live with her aunt Julia in the small dairy farm where Mae grew up.  Allie slowly comes to learn about her heritage, her family, and her mother's story. A reversal of the classic Australian theme of a child lost in the bush.

Notes

 Dedication: For Joel

Reviews
 Publishers Weekly

Awards and nominations

 2005 shortlisted Miles Franklin Literary Award 
 2005 shortlisted Queensland Premier's Literary Awards — Best Fiction Book

References 

2004 Australian novels